Reputation for a Song is a 1952 crime novel by the British writer Edward Grierson. It is an inverted detective story, breaking with many of the traditions of the established Golden Age of Detective Fiction. A young man is placed on trial accused of murdering his father. Its conclusion rests on interpretations of the presumption of innocence.

Film adaptation
In 1970 it was adapted into the film My Lover, My Son directed by John Newland and starring Romy Schneider, Dennis Waterman and Patricia Brake.

References

Bibliography
 Enser, A.G.S. Filmed Books and Plays: A List of Books and Plays from which Films Have Been Made, 1928-1974, Volume 1. Simon & Schuster, 1975.
 Hilfer, Tony. The Crime Novel: A Deviant Genre. University of Texas Press, 2014.
 Reilly, John M. Twentieth Century Crime & Mystery Writers. Springer, 2015.
 White, Terry. Justice Denoted: The Legal Thriller in American, British, and Continental Courtroom Literature. Praeger, 2003.

1952 British novels
Novels by Edward Grierson
British crime novels
British detective novels
Chatto & Windus books
Novels set in England
British novels adapted into films